Green Knowe is a series of six children's novels written by Lucy M. Boston, illustrated by her son Peter Boston, and published from 1954 to 1976. It features a very old house, Green Knowe, based on Boston's home at the time, The Manor in Hemingford Grey, Huntingdonshire, England. In the novels she brings to life the people she imagines might have lived there.

For the fourth book in the series, A Stranger at Green Knowe (1961), Boston won the annual Carnegie Medal, recognising the year's best children's book by a British subject. She was a commended runner up for both the first and second books.

Some of the stories feature Toseland, a boy called Tolly for short, and his great-grandmother Mrs. Oldknow. Green Knowe is inhabited by the spirits of people who lived there in ages past, and more than one of the spirits Tolly knows as children later grow into adults. Other supernatural entities in the series include the children's dog, Orlando; a demonic tree-spirit, Green Noah (manifesting as a large tree on the grounds of the manor house); and an animated statue of St. Christopher.

The first five books were published in the UK by Faber and Faber, from 1954 to 1964, and in the US by Harcourt, the first in 1955, and the others within the calendar year of British publication. The last book appeared after more than a decade, published by The Bodley Head and Atheneum Books in 1976.

Lucy M. Boston also published an excerpt from An Enemy At Green Knowe as a short story, "Demon at Green Knowe" (1964), which was compiled in Spook, Spooks, Spooks (1966).

WorldCat reports that the six Green Knowe novels are Boston's works most widely held by participating libraries, by a wide margin.

Synopsis

The Children of Green Knowe (1954)
The Children of Green Knowe, the first of Boston's six books about the fictional manor house Green Knowe, was a commended runner-up for the 1954 Carnegie Medal. The novel concerns the visit of a young boy, Toseland, to the magical house Green Knowe. The house is tremendously old, dating from the Norman Conquest, and has been continually inhabited by Toseland's ancestors, the d'Aulneaux family, later called Oldknowe or Oldknow. Toseland crosses floodwaters by night to reach the house, to spend the Christmas holidays with his great-grandmother, Linnet Oldknow, who addresses him as "Tolly".

Over the course of the novel, Tolly explores the rich history of his family, which pervades the house like magic. He begins to encounter what appear to be the spirits of three of his forebearsan earlier Toseland (nicknamed Toby), Alexander, and an earlier Linnetwho lived in the reign of Charles II. These meetings are for the most part not frightening to Tolly; they continually reinforce his sense of belonging that the house engenders. In the evenings, Mrs. Oldknow (whom Tolly calls "Granny") entertains Tolly with stories about the house and those who lived there. Surrounded by the rivers and the floodwater, sealed within its ancient walls, Green Knowe is a sanctuary of peace and stability in a world of unnerving change.

BBC One adapted the book in the television series The Children of Green Knowe (1986), starring Alec Christie as Tolly, Daphne Oxenford as Mrs. Oldknow, and Polly Maberly as Linnet Oldknow.

The Chimneys of Green Knowe (1958)
The Chimneys of Green Knowe was a commended runner up for the 1958 Carnegie Medal. In the United States it was published within the calendar year by Harcourt, as The Treasure of Green Knowe.

The Chimneys also features Tolly, who has returned to Green Knowe for the Easter holidays. As she mends a patchwork quilt, Mrs. Oldknow continues telling Tolly stories about the previous inhabitants of the house. This time, her stories concern Susan Oldknow, a blind girl who lived at Green Knowe during the English Regency, and the close bond of friendship that developed between her and a young black page, Jacob, brought back from the West Indies by Susan's father, Captain Oldknowe. The plot also concerns the whereabouts of Maria Oldknowe's jewels, which may or may not have been stolen by the unscrupulous butler Caxton.

The Chimneys was adapted for film as From Time to Time (2009), with Maggie Smith as Mrs. Oldknow, Hugh Bonneville as Captain Oldknowe, and Alex Etel as Tolly.

The River at Green Knowe (1959)

Mrs. Oldknow and Tolly do not appear in The River at Green Knowe. It is summertime, and the house has been rented by two old ladies: the archaeologist Doctor Biggin and her friend Miss Bun. Doctor Biggin has invited her niece Ida and two "displaced" refugee children, Oskar and Ping, to stay with her at Green Knowe.

The children arrive and begin to explore the river and canals round Green Knowe by canoe. The magic of Green Knowe is much more fantasy-based in this novel: the children see flying horses, meet a giant, and witness a Bronze Age moon ceremony. The subtext, of homeless children being protected and healed by the house and its enchantments, is particularly strong.

A Stranger at Green Knowe (1961)
The Chinese boy Ping has returned to Green Knowe alone to stay with Mrs. Oldknow. During a visit to a zoo in London before his arrival at Green Knowe, he is fascinated by the giant gorilla Hanno; as a refugee, Ping feels a powerful bond. After Hanno escapes from the zoo and makes his way to Green Knowe, Ping befriends him. The early chapters of the book detail Hanno's life as a young gorilla in Africa, and the trauma and cruelty of his capture, with great compassion and finesse. A Stranger at Green Knowe was awarded the 1961 Carnegie Medal.

An Enemy at Green Knowe (1964)
This novel takes a darker turn than previous novels in the series. Both Tolly and Ping are staying at Green Knowe. Mrs. Oldknow tells them the story of Doctor Vogel, a tutor and necromancer who came to a diabolical end at Green Knowe centuries before. The next day, Professor Melanie D. Powers appears, hunting for Vogel's occult papers. Professor Powers' interest is far from academic, however, and a mounting confrontation between the holy magic of Green Knowe and the forces of Evil, represented by Melanie Powers, commences.

The Stones of Green Knowe (1976)
This novel, the last in the sequence, tells the story of Roger d'Aulneaux, the son of the original Norman settler who built the manor house of Green Knowe. Whilst exploring the overgrown countryside, Roger discovers two throne-like stones that allow him to access the turbulent time of the Conquest, then the later periods of Linnet, Susan, and Tolly, and they to visit him in turn.

Reception
In 1956, Anthony Boucher praised the first novel as "sheer literary magic: subtle, tenuous, enchanting and wholly convincing."

In a study of "series fiction" at the turn of the century, Victor Watson opined that "A Stranger at Green Knowe is a masterpiece ... and in my opinion the greatest animal story in English children's literature". Generally, he praised Boston for "her ability 'to find exactly the right words, to groom her prose to glossy perfection'".

Adaptations
John Stadelman adapted Boston's first novel, The Children of Green Knowe, into an eponymous television drama serial comprising four episodes. It was broadcast on BBC One between 26 November and 17 December 1986.
Brian Sibley dramatised an eponymous radio play adaptation of The Children of Green Knowe, directed by Marilyn Imrie, which aired on BBC Radio 4 on 18 December 1999.
Julian Fellowes wrote and directed a film adaptation of The Chimneys of Green Knowe, titled From Time to Time (2009).

See also

Notes

References

External links

Further reading

Series of children's books
Fantasy novel series
British children's novels
Low fantasy novels
Carnegie Medal in Literature winning works
Novels about time travel
Witchcraft in written fiction
Children's fantasy novels